Daniel Goldberg (born 24 August 1965, Saint-Denis, France) is a French Socialist politician.  A mathematics teacher, he was elected deputy in 2007 to represent La Courneuve.

Biography
Goldberg was born on the August 24th 1965. He studied at the University of Paris 13 and earned a PhD at Pierre and Marie Curie University (Paris VI).

He was a member of the regional council of the Île-de-France from 2004 to 2007.

References

External links
  Official blog

1965 births
Living people
People from Saint-Denis, Seine-Saint-Denis
Politicians from Île-de-France
Socialist Party (France) politicians
Deputies of the 13th National Assembly of the French Fifth Republic
Deputies of the 14th National Assembly of the French Fifth Republic
Sorbonne Paris North University alumni
Paris 8 University Vincennes-Saint-Denis alumni